Artemisia austriaca is a species of plants belonging to the family Asteraceae.

Its native range is Europe to Western Siberia, and Iran.

References

austriaca